Ch'ŏnma County is a kun, or county, in northwestern North P'yŏngan province, North Korea.  It borders Kusŏng city and Taegwan county to the east, Sonch'ŏn and Tongrim counties to the south, Ŭiju and P'ihyŏn counties to the west, and Sakchu county to the north. It was created in 1952 from parts of Kusŏng and Ŭiju.

Geography
There are abundant mountains, with the Ch'ŏnma and Munsu ranges both traversing the county. The highest peak is Ch'ŏnmasan, 1169 m. The Ch'ŏnmasan region provides habitat for a variety of animals, and has been designated an animal protection area.

The county lies in the Yalu River basin; major tributaries draining the county include the Samgyoch'ŏn and the Kojin and Ch'ŏnma Rivers; these have been dammed to create Manp'ung Lake as well as the Taeha Reservoir, the water from which is used to water the plains along the Yellow Sea.

Administrative divisions
Ch'ŏnma county is divided into 1 ŭp (town) and 20 ri (villages):

Climate
The climate is continental, with hot summers and cold winters. The average annual temperature is 8.7 °C, with a January average of -10.7 °C and an August average of 22.6 °C.  The average annual rainfall is 1260 mm. Some 13% of the county's land is cultivated; 82% is forestland. Chonma leads the province in the production of hops.

Notes

References

See also
Geography of North Korea
Administrative divisions of North Korea
North Pyongan

External links

Counties of North Pyongan